Logan Methodist Church is a historic Methodist church located at Logan in Schuyler County, New York.  It was built in 1833 and remodeled in 1878 and is a large Federal era frame building with a veneer of Victorian era embellishment.  It is a rectangular frame structure resting on a slightly raised stone foundation.  It features a handsome central tower with a louvered belfry.  It ceased being used for church activities in 1970 and refurbished as the Logan Community Center.

It was listed on the National Register of Historic Places in 2001.

References

Logan church was actually still being used as a Methodist church in 1976

Churches on the National Register of Historic Places in New York (state)
Methodist churches in New York (state)
Federal architecture in New York (state)
Churches completed in 1833
Churches in Schuyler County, New York
National Register of Historic Places in Schuyler County, New York